São José do Xingu is a municipality in the state of Mato Grosso, in the Central-West Region of Brazil.

Plane crash
On 3 September 1989, a Varig Boeing 737-241 registration PP-VMK, operating flight 254 flying from São Paulo-Guarulhos to Belém-Val de Cães with intermediate stops, crashed near São José do Xingu while on the last leg of the flight between Marabá and Belém due to a pilot navigational error, which led to fuel exhaustion and a subsequent belly landing into the jungle, 40 km from São José do Xingu. Out of 54 occupants, there were 13 fatalities, all of them passengers. The survivors were discovered only after 4 of the occupants walked for 3 hours through the forest to find help.

See also

List of municipalities in Mato Grosso

References

External links
 Municipality of São José do Xingu 

Municipalities in Mato Grosso